The Alice and Gwendoline Cave is a limestone cave in County Clare, Ireland. It is known as the site of brown bear bones bearing the mark of butchery, which have pushed back the first known human habitation of Ireland by over two thousand years.

Location

History
Previously called the Bull Paddock Cave, the Alice and Gwendoline Cave was named for two of Alice Julia Stacpoole's daughters, Alice Jane and Gwendoline Clare Surprise, nieces of Thomas Johnson Westropp. It was investigated in 1902.

In 2016, a bear patella was discovered among the samples recovered in 1902 and deposited in the National Museum of Ireland, bearing clear butchery marks; cut marks that showed that someone was trying to remove the tendons; these could be used for sewing, fletching and hafting. It was dated to the 11th millennium BC: between 10860 and 10641 BC. This is over two thousand years earlier than the previously accepted date for the first human habitation of Ireland (the Mount Sandel Mesolithic site is dated to 7900 BC at the earliest). Dr Marion Dowd (IT Sligo) and Dr Ruth Carden (National Museum of Ireland) were co-discoverers.

References

Archaeological sites in County Clare
Limestone caves
Caves of the Republic of Ireland
Prehistoric sites in Ireland
Paleolithic sites